Patrick Regnault (born 31 March 1974 in Villers-sur-Meuse) is a French former professional footballer who played as a goalkeeper.

External links

1974 births
Living people
Association football goalkeepers
French footballers
Ligue 1 players
Ligue 2 players
OFC Charleville players
Le Mans FC players
CS Sedan Ardennes players